The Aronoff Center is a large performing arts center in downtown Cincinnati, Ohio.  Events that can typically be found at the Aronoff Center include: plays, ballet, popular music concerts, stand-up comedy shows, and musicals.  The center was designed by renowned architect César Pelli and named in honor of Cincinnati native and Ohio senator Stanley Aronoff.

Performance and other facilities
Performance facilities:
Procter & Gamble Hall, the Aronoff Center's largest theater seating 2,719
Jarson-Kaplan Theater, a mid-size theater seating 437
Fifth Third Bank Theater, a studio theater which seats up to 150

Additional event areas:
The Alice F. and Harris K. Weston Art Gallery, a  art gallery
Center Stage Room and The Green Room, used for receptions, dinners, and screenings

See also
 List of concert halls

Notes

External links

 Aronoff Center official website
 Aronoff Center Events

Performing arts centers in Ohio
Concert halls in Ohio
Theatres in Cincinnati
Music venues in Cincinnati
Art museums and galleries in Ohio
César Pelli buildings
1995 establishments in Ohio
Music venues completed in 1995